Eslamabad (also Romanized as Eslāmābād) is a village in Jolgah Rural District, in the Central District of Jahrom County, Fars Province, Iran. At the 2006 census, its population was 997, in 224 families.

References 

Populated places in Jahrom County